Charles William Whiting Wooster, was a Commander-in-Chief of the Chilean Navy. He was born in New Haven, Connecticut, in 1780, the grandson of General David Wooster. Wooster went to sea at an early age. During the War of 1812, he served on board the U.S. privateer Saratoga. Having earned substantial prize money and gained significant influence, he was named captain of the Port of New York after the war. With the death of his young wife, he chose to join the fight for independence in Chile.

References 

Chilean Navy officers
1780 births
19th-century deaths
Military personnel from New Haven, Connecticut
Chilean Navy personnel of the Spanish American wars of independence
People of the War of 1812
19th-century Chilean Navy personnel